Ben Reynolds (born 7 January 1982 in Lithgow, New South Wales) is an Australian rugby league footballer who played for the Wests Tigers and Penrith Panthers in the National Rugby League competition. His position of choice is at half-back.

Career highlights 
His junior club was the Lithgow Shamrocks. He made his first grade debut for Penrith on 2 June 2001, against the Brisbane Broncos at Penrith Stadium.

References

External links 
Ben Reynolds NRL Profile

1982 births
Living people
Australian rugby league players
Balmain Ryde-Eastwood Tigers players
Penrith Panthers players
People from the Central Tablelands
Rugby league five-eighths
Rugby league halfbacks
Rugby league players from Lithgow, New South Wales
Wests Tigers players